Georgia's 26th Senate District elects one member of the Georgia Senate. Its current representative for the 2019–20 session is Democrat David Lucas.

References

External links 

Georgia Senate districts